Mount Cairnes is a  mountain summit in the Saint Elias Mountains on the boundary line of Kluane National Park in Yukon, Canada. Its nearest higher peak is Mount Maxwell,  to the southwest. The mountain's name was officially adopted February 3, 1981, by the Geographical Names Board of Canada. Clive Elmore Cairnes (1892–1954) was active with the Geological Survey of Canada as well as the Geographic Board of Canada until his retirement in 1953. He was related to noted geologist DeLorme Donaldson Cairnes (1879–1917), for whom this mountain is named.

Climate

Based on the Köppen climate classification, Mount Cairnes is located in a subarctic climate with long, cold, snowy winters, and mild summers. Temperatures can drop below −20 °C with wind chill factors below −30 °C. Precipitation runoff from the peak and meltwater from its pocket glaciers drains into tributaries of the Kaskawulsh River.

See also

List of mountains of Canada
Geography of Yukon

References

External links
 Parks Canada website: Kluane
 Weather forecast: Mount Cairnes

Two-thousanders of Yukon
Saint Elias Mountains
Kluane National Park and Reserve